Wakwella Bridge is a bridge situated in Galle District near Thelikada, Sri Lanka. Built on the Gin Ganga Dam, the bridge links the villages of Kudagoda and Gonapura. It was constructed in 1999 and at the time was the longest bridge in the country.

See also
List of bridges in Sri Lanka
. The current bridge has their piers between every 15 feet and with 5 feet of piers. Which made of steel. But due to the population growth of near areas increase up the passengers accessing of the bridge, then the current bridge is not enough for the demand at the moment.

References

Bridges in Galle District